Jacone Puligo was an Italian painter of the Renaissance period, active in Florence. He was the brother of Domenico Puligo, was also an apprentice to Andrea del Sarto.

References

16th-century Italian painters
Italian male painters
Painters from Florence
Italian Renaissance painters
Year of death unknown
Year of birth unknown